The 2017–18 Central Arkansas Bears basketball team represented the University of Central Arkansas during the 2017–18 NCAA Division I men's basketball season. The Bears were led by fourth-year head coach Russ Pennell and played their home games at the Farris Center in Conway, Arkansas as members of the Southland Conference. They finished the season 18–17, 10–8 in Southland play to finish in seventh place. They defeated Lamar in the first round of the Southland tournament before losing in the quarterfinals to Stephen F. Austin. They were invited to the College Basketball Invitational where they defeated Seattle before losing in the quarterfinals to Jacksonville State.

Previous season
The Bears finished the 2016–17 season 8–24, 7–11 in Southland play to finish in a five-way tie for eighth place. They lost in the first round of the Southland tournament to Sam Houston State.

Roster

Schedule and results

|-
!colspan=9 style=| Non-Conference regular season

|-
!colspan=9 style=|Southland regular season

|-
!colspan=9 style=| Southland tournament

|-
!colspan=9 style=| CBI

See also
2017–18 Central Arkansas Sugar Bears basketball team

References

Central Arkansas Bears basketball seasons
Central Arkansas
Central Arkansas
Central Arkansas Bears basketball
Central Arkansas Bears basketball